The 1969 South African Open was an independent combined men's and women's tennis tournament played on outdoor hard courts at Ellis Park in Johannesburg, South Africa. It was the 66th edition of the tournament and was held from 1 April through 12 April 1969. Rod Laver won the singles title in the men's division, while Billie Jean King won the singles titles in the women's.

Finals

Men's singles

 Rod Laver defeated  Tom Okker 6–3, 10–8, 6–3

Women's singles
 Billie Jean King defeated  Nancy Richey 6–3, 6–4

Men's doubles
 Pancho Gonzales /  Ray Moore defeated  Bob Hewitt /  Frew McMillan 6–3, 4–6, 6–1, 6–3

Women's doubles
 Françoise Dürr /  Ann Jones defeated  Nancy Richey /  Virginia Wade 6–2, 3–6, 6–4

Mixed doubles
 Tom Okker /  Annette Van Zyl defeated  Bob Maud /  Virginia Wade 8–6, 5–7, 6–4

References

South African Open (tennis)
South African Open (tennis)
1969 in South African tennis
Sports competitions in Johannesburg
1960s in Johannesburg
April 1969 sports events in Africa